Aseem Ravindra Shukla is the Director of Minimally Invasive Surgery in the Department of Urology at the Children's Hospital of Philadelphia, PA and is a Professor of Surgery (Urology) at the Perelman School of Medicine at the University of Pennsylvania. Shukla is the co-founder and board member of the Hindu American Foundation.

Medical career

Education
Dr. Aseem Shukla completed undergraduate studies at the University of Florida and received his Doctor of Medicine degree from the University of South Florida. He then went on to do his residency in General Surgery and Urology at the same institution. Following that, he did his fellowship in pediatric urology at The Children's Hospital of Philadelphia, Philadelphia, PA, consistently ranked the number one children's hospital in the United States.

Shukla completed residencies in general surgery and urology at the University of South Florida College of Medicine and a fellowship in pediatric urology at The Children’s Hospital of Philadelphia (CHOP). Prior to returning to CHOP, he served as director of urology at University of Minnesota Amplatz Children’s Hospital and held associate professorships in urology and pediatrics at the University of Minnesota.  Dr. Shukla additionally served as the Residency Program Director of the University of Minnesota Department of Urology.  At CHOP, Dr. Shukla is the Director of Minimally Invasive Surgery with a keen clinical and research interest in robotic-assisted laparoscopy, urinary reflux, hydronephrosis, urinary tract reconstruction, hypospadias and disorders of sexual differentiation.

International Bladder Exstrophy Collaboration 
Shukla is active in efforts to develop pediatric urology as a discipline globally.  Since 2009, Shukla leads an annual complex pediatric urological surgery teaching course and multi-institutional collaboration—The International Bladder-Exstrophy and Epispadias Collaborative—at the Civil Hospital in Ahmedabad, India that is supported by the Association for the Bladder Exstrophy Community  and Hindu American Physicians in Seva.  Shukla is also a volunteer surgeon for the Foundation for the Children of Iran, a not-for-profit organization founded in 1991 by Princess Yasmine Pahlavi, to help arrange medical and surgical treatment for Iranian children.

Religious Advocacy 
Shukla is the co-founder and board member of the Hindu American Foundation, a religious advocacy group founded in 2002. Shukla frequently writes a weblog for the Washington Post's On Faith section and participated in a widely read online debate with Deepak Chopra over the Hindu roots of yoga.

Debate with Deepak Chopra
In April 2010, Shukla, on a Washington Post-sponsored blog on faith and religion, criticized Chopra for suggesting that yoga did not have origins in Hinduism but is instead an Indian spiritual tradition which predated Hinduism. Later on, Chopra tried to explain yoga as rooted in "consciousness alone" which according to him, is a universal, non-sectarian eternal wisdom of life expounded by Vedic rishis long before historic Hinduism arose. Chopra accused Shukla of having a "fundamentalist agenda." In a rejoinder entitled "Dr. Chopra: Honor thy heritage" Shukla called Chopra an exponent of the art of "How to Deconstruct, Repackage and Sell Hindu Philosophy Without Calling it Hindu!" Responding to the allegation of being a fundamentalist, Shukla accused Chopra of raising the "bogey of communalism" in order to divert the argument. The Shukla vs. Chopra debate, and the Hindu American Foundation's Take Back Yoga campaign, was subsequently covered in the New York Times and Newsweek magazine.

Debate with Wendy Doniger
In March 2010, Shukla debated with Wendy Doniger on elements of one of her books on a Washington Post sponsored blog on faith and religion, and accused her of sexualising and exoticising some of the holiest passages in the Hindu scriptures. Doniger replied that her book has sold well in India and asked her critics to show specifically where her interpretations of texts were wrong.

References

Sources

External links 
 Penn Medicine biography and academic publications.

Living people
Year of birth missing (living people)
American urologists
American Hindus
University of Minnesota faculty
Perelman School of Medicine at the University of Pennsylvania faculty